Jan Palach Square is a town square in the Old Town of Prague. It is located on right bank of the Vltava River next to the former Jewish Quarter.

Buildings and structures
The western side of the square is adjacent to the Vltava River. The Mánes Bridge (1911–1916) connects Jan Palach Square to Malá Strana (Lesser Town) on the opposite bank. This side of the square also offers a good view of Prague Castle, Petřín Hill and Charles Bridge. On the north there is the Neo-Renaissance Rudolfinum Concert Hall (1876–1884). The building on the eastern side (1924–1930) houses the Faculty of Arts (Czech: Filozofická fakulta) of Charles University, and the building on the southern side (1885) belongs to the Academy of Arts, Architecture and Design (Czech: Vysoká škola umělecko-průmyslová).

There is a large underground parking garage under the square, with surface structures of this facility slightly disturbing the overall impression of the square. Monuments to two personalities of Czech culture are situated here—a statue of composer Antonín Dvořák in front of Rudolfinum and a statue of painter Josef Mánes closer to the river.

Name of the square
The previous name of the square, used through the communist era, was the Square of Red Army Soldiers (Náměstí Krasnoarmějců) from the year 1948, commemorating Soviet soldiers killed during their liberation of Prague in May 1945. Before this the name was Rejdiště after riding hall standing in the place. The current name was introduced briefly in 1969–1970 and was made permanent on 20 December 1989 after the Velvet Revolution. It commemorates Jan Palach, a student who immolated himself on 16 January 1969 to protest against the Soviet occupation of Czechoslovakia.

Transport
Jan Palach Square is accessible by trams Nos. 17 and 18 or by the A Line of Prague Metro. The exit of Staroměstská metro station is located next to the southeast corner of the square, and across the nearby bridge is Malostranská metro station.

See also
 Jan Palach

References

External links 

Squares in Prague